The Nikon Z 5 is a full-frame mirrorless interchangeable-lens camera produced by Nikon. The camera was officially announced on July 21, 2020, at the price of US$1,399.00. It is an entry-level full-frame camera that uses Nikon's Z-mount system.

Features 

 24.3 megapixel CMOS sensor
 ISO 100 - 51,200
 Expeed 6 processor
 In-body image stabilization (IBIS)
 3.2-inch touchscreen
 3.69 million-dot OLED viewfinder
 Dual UHS-II SD card slots
 Made in Thailand

References 

Nikon MILC cameras
Nikon Z-mount cameras
Full-frame mirrorless interchangeable lens cameras
Cameras introduced in 2020